Ziba is a genus of sea snails, marine gastropod mollusks in the family Mitridae.

Species
The genus Ziba used to contain more than 30 species, but many were recently reassigned to other genera, including Imbricaria and Subcancilla. As of 2018, the genus Ziba contains the following three species:
 Ziba carinata (Swainson, 1824)
 Ziba gambiana (Dohrn, 1861)
 Ziba ogoouensis Biraghi, 1984

References

 Cernohorsky W. O. (1991). The Mitridae of the world (Part 2). Monographs of Marine Mollusca 4. page(s): 37

Mitridae
Gastropod genera